The San Patricio de Hibernia Monument,  in San Patricio, Texas, was erected in 1937.  It was listed on the National Register of Historic Places in 2018.

It was designed by sculptor Raoul Josset and architects Page & Southerland.

See also
Sons of San Patricio Monument

References

National Register of Historic Places in San Patricio County, Texas
Monuments and memorials in Texas
Buildings and structures completed in 1937
Texas Revolution monuments and memorials
History of Texas